Luminescence is the "spontaneous emission of radiation from an electronically excited species (or from a vibrationally excited species) not in thermal equilibrium with its environment", according to IUPAC definition. A luminescent object is emitting "cold light", in contrast to "incandescence", where an object only emits light after heating. Generally, emission of light is due to the movement of electrons between different energy levels within an atom after excitation by external factors. However, the exact mechanism of light emission in "vibrationally excited species" is unknown, as seen in sonoluminescence. 

There are various ways to make an object emit light, such as by light (photoluminescence), chemical reactions (chemiluminescence), electrical energy (electroluminescence), ultrasound vibrations (sonoluminescence), and by ionising radiation (radioluminescence).

The dials, hands, scales, and signs of aviation and navigational instruments and markings are often coated with luminescent materials in a process known as "luminising".

Types
Photoluminescence, a result of the absorption of photons
Fluorescence, traditionally defined as the emission of light that ends immediately after the source of excitation is removed. As the definition does not fully describe the phenomenon, quantum mechanics is employed where it is defined as there is no change in spin multiplicity from the state of excitation to emission of light.
Phosphorescence, traditionally defined as persistent emission of light after the end of excitation. As the definition does not fully describe the phenomenon, quantum mechanics is employed where it is defined as there is a change in spin multiplicity from the state of excitation to the emission of light.
Chemiluminescence, the emission of light as a result of a chemical reaction
Bioluminescence, a result of biochemical reactions in a living organism
Electrochemiluminescence, a result of an electrochemical reaction
Lyoluminescence, a result of dissolving a solid (usually heavily irradiated) in a liquid solvent
Candoluminescence, is light emitted by certain materials at elevated temperatures, which differs from the blackbody emission expected at the temperature in question.
Crystalloluminescence, produced during crystallization
Electroluminescence, a result of an electric current passed through a substance
Cathodoluminescence, a result of a luminescent material being struck by electrons
Mechanoluminescence, a result of a mechanical action on a solid
Triboluminescence, generated when bonds in a material are broken when that material is scratched, crushed, or rubbed
Fractoluminescence, generated when bonds in certain crystals are broken by fractures
Piezoluminescence, produced by the action of pressure on certain solids
Sonoluminescence, a result of imploding bubbles in a liquid when excited by sound
Radioluminescence, a result of bombardment by ionizing radiation
Thermoluminescence, the re-emission of absorbed energy when a substance is heated
Cryoluminescence, the emission of light when an object is cooled (an example of this is wulfenite)

Applications
Light-emitting diodes (LEDs) emit light via electro-luminescence.
Phosphors, materials that emit light when irradiated by higher-energy electromagnetic radiation or particle radiation
Laser, and lamp industry
Phosphor thermometry, measuring temperature using phosphorescence
Thermoluminescence dating
Thermoluminescent dosimeter
Non-disruptive observation of processes within a cell.

Luminescence occurs in some minerals when they are exposed to low-powered sources of ultraviolet or infrared electromagnetic radiation (for example, portable UV lamps), at atmospheric pressure and atmospheric temperatures. This property of these minerals can be used during the process of mineral identification at rock outcrops in the field, or in the laboratory.

History
The term "luminescence" was first introduced in 1888.

See also
 List of light sources
Scientific American, "Luminous Paint" (historical aspects), 10-Dec-1881, pp.368

References

External links

Fluorophores.org A database of luminescent dyes

 
Light sources
1880s neologisms